Erineo "Ayong" Saquilayan Maliksi (March 25, 1938 – February 24, 2021) was a Filipino politician from the province of Cavite. As an elected official, he served in different capacities in the municipal government of Imus and the provincial government of Cavite. He represented the 2nd and 3rd congressional districts of Cavite in the 11th and 15th Congress of the Philippines, respectively.

After serving as a congressman in the House of Representatives, Maliksi was appointed by then-President Benigno Aquino III as the Chairman of the Philippine Charity Sweepstakes Office, serving the agency from April 2015 to August 2016.

Education 
Maliksi finished his elementary education at Anabu II Elementary School in Imus in 1951, whose old main building was replaced by a modern three-story building during his term as governor. He finished his secondary education at Del Pilar Academy, also in Imus, in 1955. In 1969, Maliksi graduated from University of the East, earning a bachelor's degree in political science.

Political career

Vice Mayor of Imus (1980–1986) 
Maliksi was first elected to public office as Vice Mayor of then municipality of Imus, Cavite, where he served for two consecutive terms from 1980 to 1986.

Mayor of Imus (1988–1998) 
After the EDSA Revolution, Maliksi was elected as Mayor of Imus, which he held from 1988 to 1998. During his term, Imus became well known as the "Christmas Capital of the Philippines," with its colorful lanterns, lights and nativity scenes (belen) during the yuletide season.

House of Representatives (1998–2001) 
In 1998, Maliksi ran for the position of 2nd district Representative of Cavite, at the 11th Congress. Maliksi served a full 3-year term until 2001.

Governor of Cavite (2001–2010) 
By 2001, Maliksi ran an uphill gubernatorial race against first-term incumbent Ramon "Bong" Revilla Jr. Mostly known by many as an actor, Revilla also hailed from a highly respected political clan in Bacoor, Cavite. In 1995, Revilla was also elected as Vice-Governor of Cavite. With the appointment of then-Governor Epimaco Velasco as Secretary of Interior and Local Government, Revilla assumed the position of Governor. in 1998, he would run for the same position and eventually win.

Despite Revilla's popularity and his family's political background, Maliksi won against Revilla by a wide margin for the position of Governor.

Maliksi went on to serve two more terms until 2010.

Return to the House of Representatives (2010–2013) 
In 2010, Maliksi ran and won as Representative of the redistricted 3rd district of Cavite, which covers only Imus. It was during this time that Imus became a chartered city, by virtue of Republic Act No. 10161. The passage of the law was initiated by Rep. Maliksi, who authored House Bill No. 4729, creating the City of Imus. With the eventual enactment into law and the ratification by its registered voters, the municipality of Imus was converted into a component city to be known as the City of Imus.

Gubernatorial run (2013) 
In the 2013 Cavite local elections, Maliksi ran for Governor, challenging his successor Jonvic Remulla. Remulla was the running mate of Maliksi during the 2001 and 2004 elections. Remulla eventually broke ties with Maliksi after the 2004 elections, and then proceeded to file an administrative case against Maliksi. During the campaign, Remulla used the cases he filed to undermine Maliksi. The cases, which were eventually dismissed by the courts, negatively impacted the campaign of Maliksi. Remulla went on to win the election with a margin of over 50,000 votes.

Chairman of Philippine Charity Sweepstakes Office (2015–2016) 
In 2015, President Benigno Aquino III appointed Maliksi as Chairman of the Philippine Charity Sweepstakes Office. Maliksi held the position until August 2016.

Gubernatorial run (2019) 
In the 2019 Cavite local elections, Maliksi ran for Governor, but lost to Jonvic Remulla once again, this time by a landslide victory. He only won in three municipalities of Cavite, such as Carmona, Maragondon, and Rosario.

Personal life 
Ayong Maliksi was married to Olivia Leonardo-Maliksi and was the father of former Imus City Mayor Emmanuel "Manny" Maliksi.

Illness and death
Maliksi tested positive for COVID-19 on February 14, 2021 but later tested negative when he had a cardiac arrest. He suffered a COVID-19-induced stroke, according to his son Emmanuel, the then-mayor of Imus.

Maliksi died on February 24, 2021, at the age of 82. Governor Jonvic Remulla had ordered flags at provincial government offices in Cavite to be flown half mast in mourning of his death.

References

External links
I-site Profile

|-

|-

|-

|-

|-

|-

1938 births
2021 deaths
People from Imus
Liberal Party (Philippines) politicians
PDP–Laban politicians
Politicians from Cavite
Laban ng Demokratikong Pilipino politicians
Kilusang Bagong Lipunan politicians
University of the East alumni
Members of the House of Representatives of the Philippines from Cavite
Mayors of places in Cavite
Governors of Cavite
Deaths from the COVID-19 pandemic in the Philippines
Deaths from cerebrovascular disease